Pauly Burke (born February 3, 1974 in Cedar Rapids, Iowa) is a former professional road racing cyclist.  He is now living in Manhattan.

Cycling career
As a professional road racing cyclist, Pauly raced for the Landbouwkrediet-Colnago, Tonissteiner, and the IPSO-Euroclean professional cycling teams; all based in Belgium.  

As an amateur, Pauly rode for US Montauban (France) and Kingsnorth Int. Wheelers (UK). He is also a former member of the U.S. National Cycling team.

Post cycling career
Pauly graduated from the Circle in the Square Theatre School in New York City.  He currently resides in Manhattan.

References

1974 births
American male cyclists
Living people
Sportspeople from Cedar Rapids, Iowa